Kantar Media Research Philippines (formerly known as Kantar/TNS Philippines, popularly called Kantar Media Philippines or simply Kantar Media), is a market research firm in the Philippines specializing in broadcast media.  Kantar Media is responsible for audience measurement of television ratings for the entire Philippines. Kantar Media's main television partner is ABS-CBN .
 
As of 2015, Kantar Media uses a nationwide panel size of 2,610 urban and rural households, with a respondent base of 7,000 individuals that represent one hundred percent (100%) of the total Philippine TV viewing population.
 
The panel reports on 7 sectors namely National Capital Region, Suburbs, North Luzon, Central Luzon, South Luzon, Visayas and Mindanao. Suburbs consists of 4 provinces namely Bulacan, Cavite, Laguna, and Rizal.

History
In January 2009, Kantar Media officially released its national television audience measurement data in the Philippines via Taylor Nelson Sofres (TNS) Media, a subsidiary of Kantar Group. In February 2009, Kantar Group merged TNS with Kantar Media Research International and now called Kantar Media.

In June 2012, Kantar Media launched its Mega Manila TV Advertising Expenditure Service, which is integrated with its audience measurement service through Infosys+, which provides faster access to information and integrates data from time blocks, programs, and advertisements into a single analysis to serve the leading local and regional broadcast networks, advertising agencies, and media planners. Furthermore, Kantar Media also provides custom media research services for radio, print, and digital media.

Kantar Media became the official radio survey partner of the Radio Research Council (RRC) and Kapisanan ng mga Brodkaster ng Pilipinas (KBP) in December 2014, covering 53 cities in the Philippines.

Originally, due to the COVID-19 pandemic and broadcast stoppage of its main partner ABS-CBN due to non-renewal of its congressional franchise on July 10, 2020, Kantar Media announced that it supposed to end its television ratings service by the end of 2020, but the plan was reversed after ABS-CBN secured a deal with ZOE Broadcasting Network to air some programs on A2Z Channel 11 (formerly ZOE TV).

References

Television in the Philippines
Market research companies of the Philippines
WPP plc
Companies based in Quezon City
Philippine subsidiaries of foreign companies